Arab al-Shamalina also known as Khirbat Abu Zayna was a Palestinian Arab village in the Safad Subdistrict. It was depopulated during the 1947–1948 Civil War in Mandatory Palestine on May 4, 1948, under Operation Matate (Broom), a sub operation of Operation Yiftach. It was located 13 km southeast of Safad near the Jordan River.

In 1945 it had a population of 650.

History

The village was located north of Lake Tiberias, west of the Jordan River. The villagers were members of the ‘Arab al-Shamalina Bedouin tribe and several archaeological sites have been found in the vicinity.

In 1875, Victor Guérin found here the foundations of a building with walls one metre in thickness.

In 1881, the PEF's Survey of Western Palestine (SWP) noted: "Modern Arab granaries and slight traces of modern ruined houses"  at Kh. Abu Zeineh, or Shunet esh Shemalneh.

British Mandate era
In the 1922 census of Palestine, conducted by the British Mandate authorities, Shamalneh  had a population of 278, all Muslims,  increasing in the 1931 census to 551; 1 Christian and 555  Muslims,  in  a total of 108  houses.

In  the 1944/45 statistic  the village was counted with Al-Butayha, and together they had a total 16,690  dunums  of land. Of this, 3,842 dunums was allocated to cereals,  238 dunums were irrigated or used for orchards, while 12,610 dunams were classified as non-cultivable land. Several springs in the area provided water.

1948 war and depopulation
Under Operation Matateh (lit. Operation Broom), a sub operation of Operation Yiftach, the village, along with others between Lake al-Hula and Lake Tiberias was depopulated by Israeli forces on 4 May 1948. Israeli historian Benny Morris has documented that the troops were given specific orders to attack the village and destroy it. The attack commenced with Palmach troops bombarding the area, causing the villagers to flee.

The settlement of Almagor was established 2 km northwest of the village site in 1961.

In 1992 the village site was described: "The site, which is mostly covered with thorny grass, is strewn with the rubble of houses. Eucalyptus and palm trees also grow on the site. Most of the surrounding land is used as pasture, although some of it is cultivated."

References

Bibliography

External links
Welcome To 'Arab al-Shamalina
   'Arab al-Shamalina, Zochrot
Survey of Western Palestine, Map 6: IAA, Wikimedia commons
'Arab al-Shamalina at Khalil Sakakini Cultural Center
‘Arab al-Shamalina, Dr. Khalil Rizk.

Arab villages depopulated during the 1948 Arab–Israeli War
District of Safad